Hulakoppa is a village in Dharwad district of Karnataka, India.

Hulakoppa is also called as Galagi-Hulakoppa, as it's a commix of Galagi and Hulakoppa small twin villages.

Primary school: Govt. Model Primary School.

Higher Sec School: Smt. Shivarajadevi Composite Pre-University College (SSCPU College).

Demographics 
As of the 2011 Census of India there were 346 households in Hulakoppa and a total population of 1,782 consisting of 903 males and 879 females. There were 238 children ages 0-6.

References

Villages in Dharwad district